Karen Mahlab  is an Australian businesswoman and. In 2016 she was the Victorian finalist in the Telstra Business Women's Awards in the category of social purpose businesses.

Mahlab established Pro Bono Australia in 1999 as a network for people and organisations working in the not-for-profit sector. The business delivers independent news, opinions, surveys, jobs, skilled-professional volunteer matching, webinars and podcasts to senior decision makers in the sector. Prior to her work on Pro Bono Australia, Mahlab ran a publishing company, Mahlab Group, for 10 years.

In 2015 Mahlab was appointed a Member of the Order of Australia for her significant contribution to the not-for-profit sector and philanthropic initiatives. In 2017 she was appointed Chair of the Advisory Committee of Swinburne University of Technology’s Social Innovation Research Institute.

References

Living people
Year of birth missing (living people)
Members of the Order of Australia
Australian women company founders
Australian company founders